Valdis Brauns  (born March 27, 1945) is a Soviet and Latvian photographer, participant and prize-winner of international exhibitions.

Biography
He was born March 27, 1945. Since 1966 he served in the ranks of the Soviet Army. There he began to study the theory of photography and take the first professional pictures.

Participated in more than 280 international exhibitions, has 142 awards. Awarded the title of EFIAP[fr]  of the Fédération Internationale de l'Art Photographique.

The works of Valdis Brauns are in the collections of FIAP, the French photographic museum Bjevr, the Latvian Museum of Photography, the Siauliai Museum of Photography (Lithuania), the Spanish Museum of Photography (Catalonia), in private collections in the US, Germany, Russia, the Czech Republic, Hungary, India and Lithuania.

Lives and works in Riga.

References

External links
 Valdis Brauns. Menininkai

1945 births
Living people
People from Ventspils Municipality
Soviet photographers
Latvian photographers